= Murder in Maryland law =

Aspect of Maryland criminal law

Murder in Maryland law constitutes the intentional killing, under circumstances defined by law, of people within or under the jurisdiction of the U.S. state of Maryland.

The United States Centers for Disease Control and Prevention reported that in the year 2024, the state had the tenth highest murder rate in the country.

== Penalties ==
Offense	Mandatory sentencing
Involuntary manslaughter	Maximum of 10 years in prison
Voluntary manslaughter	Maximum of 10 years in prison
Second degree murder	Maximum of 40 years in prison
First degree murder	Life without parole or life (minimum of 20 years; the judge can suspend part of the sentence)
